Alisa Sergeevna Krylova (rus. Алиса Сергеевна Крылова) — (born June 21, 1982 in Mirny, Yakutia) is a Russian model, the winner of Mrs. Russia 2010 and Mrs. Globe 2011 beauty contests.

Biography

Krylova was the first child in the family, she had 2 brothers and 2 sisters. Her first education is Patrice Lumumba Peoples' Friendship University of Russia, specialty of "Economics and Law". The second education is Moscow State University of Service, specialty of "Anti-crisis Management of the Economy".

On August 28, 2011 the 15th Mrs. Globe 2011 anniversary beauty contest was held in California. 60 titled married women from all over the world competed for the crown. Krylova became the winner of this contest.

Contests

Krylova is the winner of the following beauty contests:
 "Mrs. Russia 2010"
 "Mrs. Globe 2011"

Titles and awards
Krylova is the winner of the following titles and awards:
 Mrs. Russia (2010)
 Mrs. Globe (2011)

 “The Desperate Housewife” contest. “The Silver Rain” radio station. 2011.
 The title “Mrs. Globe” was won by the Moscovite. Komsomolskaya Pravda. August 30, 2011.
 Alisa Krylova – Mrs.Globe 2011. Beautifulrus.com. Russian Personalities.
 Mrs. World ALISA KRYLOVA for L'OFFICIEL CENTRAL ASIA. "Look at me" magazine. March 12, 2012
 BACKSTAGE HAYARI AVEC ALISA KRYLOVA. 2012
 Charity is an honorable duty. The administration of Bryansk region. June 7, 2012.
 Supermodel Alisa Krylova on the cover of the new L'OFFICIEL Azerbaijan. Life-Star.ru May 14, 2014
 Alisa Krylova, the supermodel, won Kenia. Woman’s day. February 20, 2014.
 Supermodel Alisa Krylova will be the pilot (PHOTOS). Life-Star.ru August 18, 2014
 "Russia's Rich Forego Some Luxuries but Still Back Vladimir Putin". NDTV. March 29, 2015
 "Sanctions? I can pop to France for cheese, says Russian model". The TELEGRAPH. March 29, 2015
 Alisa Krylova was made an honorary member of the jury of the Moscow Competition of Young Designers. Life-Star.ru April 9, 2015
 Supermodel Alisa Krylova became the face of Hayari Parfums. Selflovers internet-magazine. January 30, 2015
 Interview with ALISA KRYLOVA: "The greatest achievement in my life - my children, my family." InSTYLE magazine. Summer 2016
 "Mrs. World on the Riviera France". ServiceAzur gazeta. December 29, 2016 
 Cover story: ALISA KRYLOVA. InSTYLE magazine. June 2017
 "Who is Alisa?": top 5 most famous Alisa of Russia. AMIC magazine. July 4, 2017

External links
alisakrylova.com — official website of Alisa Sergeevna Krylova

1982 births
Russian female models
Russian journalists
Living people